The Father David Bauer Olympic Arena is an ice hockey arena in Calgary, Alberta, Canada. It seats about 1,750 for hockey with a standing room capacity of over 2,000. It is named after Father David Bauer.

Canada's defunct national touring team, the brainchild of Bauer, also staged tryouts there. The arena was built in 1963.

A second arena, the Norma Bush Arena is attached to the facility, and has a  artificial ice surface.

The arena was the home of the Calgary Mustangs of the Alberta Junior Hockey League and is the home arena for the Calgary Dinos university hockey team.  It is also the home of the Western Hockey League major junior circuit, the AAA Midget Flames of the Alberta Midget Hockey League and is often used as the training facility for the Canadian Olympic and junior national teams.

FDB also hosts games for the annual Mac's AAA midget hockey tournament.

The arena was used for a few ice hockey games at the 1988 Winter Olympics as well as the compulsory figures section of the men's and women's figure skating competitions .

The arena is located in the same complex as McMahon Stadium and Foothills Stadium, adjacent to the University of Calgary.

See also
Sport in Calgary

References

Venues of the 1988 Winter Olympics
Olympic ice hockey venues
Sports venues in Calgary
Indoor ice hockey venues in Canada
Indoor arenas in Alberta
Sports venues completed in 1963
1963 establishments in Alberta